Johannes Mayer (6 September 1893 – 7 August 1963) was a German General of the Infantry in the Wehrmacht of Nazi Germany during World War II. He was a recipient of the Knight's Cross of the Iron Cross with Oak Leaves and Swords.

Promotions
9.3.1915 Fahnenjunker
2.9.1915 Fähnrich
5.11.1915 Leutnant (Patent from 23.3.1914)
1.7.1922 Leutnant with Patent from 1.4.1914
1.7.1923 Oberleutnant 
1.4.1928 Rittmeister 
 later changed to Hauptmann 
1.2.1935 Major 
1.10.1937 Oberstleutnant
1.10.1940 Oberst
1.4.1942 Generalmajor (without RDA)
1.9.1942 Generalmajor (with RDA)
1.2.1943 Generalleutnant
1.4.1945 General der Infanterie

Awards
 Iron Cross (1914) 
 2nd Class (24 August 1915)
 1st Class (16 December 1916)
 The Honour Cross of the World War 1914/1918 with swords
 Wehrmacht Long Service Award, 4th to 1st class
 Clasp to the Iron Cross 
 2nd Class (6 June 1940)
 1st Class (9 June 1940)
 Infantry Assault Badge in Silver
 Eastern Front Medal
 Wound Badge in Black (1944)
 Cuff title "Kurland"
 Knight's Cross of the Iron Cross with Oak Leaves and Swords
 Knight's Cross on 13 September 1941 as Oberst and commander of Infanterie-Regiment 501/290. Infanterie-Division/X. Armee-Korps/16. Armee/Heeresgruppe Nord
 Oak Leaves on 13 April 1944 as Generalleutnant and commander of the 329. Infanterie-Division
 Swords on 23 August 1944 as Generalleutnant and commander of the 329. Infanterie-Division/VIII. Armee-Korps/16. Armee/Heeresgruppe Nord

References

Citations

Bibliography

 
 

1893 births
1963 deaths
People from Prignitz
German Army generals of World War II
Generals of Infantry (Wehrmacht)
German Army personnel of World War I
Prussian Army personnel
People from the Province of Brandenburg
Recipients of the Knight's Cross of the Iron Cross with Oak Leaves and Swords
University of Greifswald alumni
Technical University of Berlin alumni
Recipients of the clasp to the Iron Cross, 1st class
Reichswehr personnel
Military personnel from Brandenburg